The Bogue class were a class of 45 escort carriers built in the United States for service with the US Navy and the Royal Navy, through the Lend-Lease program, during World War II. Following the war, ten Bogue-class ships were kept in service by the US Navy and were reclassified for helicopter and aircraft transport operations.

Following the war, those ships that served with the Royal Navy were returned to the United States and were either scrapped or converted for mercantile use.

Construction and design
The Bogue-class escort carriers were based on the Maritime Commission's Type C3 cargo ships hull. They all were named for sounds. All of the ships for the US Navy and half of the ships for the Royal Navy were built by the Seattle-Tacoma Shipbuilding Corporation, some of the early Royal Navy ships were produced by Ingalls Shipbuilding of Pascagoula, Mississippi, and Western Pipe and Steel Company of San Francisco, California.

Specifications

Propulsion and power
The previous  and s had suffered from reliability issues with their diesel engines  so it was decided that the Bogues would use two water-tube boilers, built by Foster-Wheeler, feeding steam to an Allis-Chalmers steam turbine engine connected to a single shaft.

Aircraft facilities

The Bogue class had the capacity for up to 24 anti-submarine or fighter aircraft, which could be a mixture of the Grumman Wildcat, Vought F4U Corsair and Grumman Avenger. The exact composition of the embarked squadrons depended upon the mission. Some squadrons were composite squadrons for convoy defence, and would be equipped with anti-submarine and fighter aircraft, while other squadrons working in a strike-carrier role would only be equipped with fighter aircraft. When utilised in ferry service the ships could carry up to 90 aircraft between both the flight and hangar decks. Aircraft facilities consisted of a small combined bridge–flight control island on the forward starboard side of the ship. Two  elevators were placed on the flight deck, one at the stern and one near the bow. The hangar deck retained the camber at the bow and stern of the main deck of the merchant ships they were built on. Since the elevators were placed near the ends of the flight deck, pulleys were required for handling planes on and off of them on the hangar deck, which was difficult in normal conditions, and impossible in rough seas. The ships were also equipped with derricks for retrieving seaplanes and loading and unloading aircraft.

Armament
The Bogue class was equipped with a variety of weapons, which varied throughout the war and from ship to ship. The early ships were equipped with two /51 caliber guns for surface targets, on sponsons at either side of the stern, these were soon refit with two 5-inch/38 caliber dual-purpose guns, and standardized on the remaining ships of the class. For anti-aircraft (AA) cover they were only equipped with ten  Oerlikon cannons. This was later augmented with up to eight twin mounted  Bofors AA guns and an additional 10 to 18 Oerlikons in single or twin mounts.

After the war, the 10 remaining Bogue class escort carriers retained in US service were re-designated as "helicopter escort carriers" (CVHE) in 1955, and five of these were re-designated as "utility escort carriers" (CVU) in 1958, then aircraft ferry (AKV) in 1958, and operating under US Military Sea Transportation Service (MSTS) during the Vietnam War.

Transfer to the Royal Navy

Thirty-four of the 45 ships of the Bogue class were transferred to the Royal Navy under the provisions of the Lend-Lease program; they were given new names for their RN service and returned to the US Navy after the war. These ships had been converted from Maritime Commission Type C3 cargo ships that were finished or had already been laid down.

As delivered, these carriers required modifications to conform to Royal Naval standards. The Attacker class ships had their conversions carried out in drydocks in United Kingdom, but due to these ports being overwhelmed 19 of the 23 ships of the Ameer class were converted by Burrard Dry Dock at Vancouver, British Columbia, Canada. These included extending the flight deck, fitting redesigned flying controls and fighter direction layout, modifications to the hangar, accommodation and store rooms, extra safety measures, oiling at sea arrangements, gunnery and other internal communications, extra wireless and radio facilities, ship blackout arrangements and other items deemed necessary for British service.

The consequential delays in getting these ships into active service caused critical comments from some in the US Navy.

Ships of class
Converted from C-3 cargo ships.

First group

Second group
Built from the keel up as escort carriers. All were built by the Seattle-Tacoma Shipbuilding Corporation.
General characteristics as the Attacker class, except for displacement and armament.

See also
List of aircraft carriers
List of aircraft carriers of World War II
List of ship classes of World War II

References

Bibliography

External links

Bogue class at UBoat.net
repeat Bogue class at UBoat.net
Aircraft carriers of the Royal Navy

Escort aircraft carrier classes
 
World War II escort aircraft carriers of the United States
World War II aircraft carriers of the United Kingdom